Sambú is a corregimiento in Chepigana District, Darién Province, Panama with a population of 931 as of 2010. Its population as of 1990 was 762; its population as of 2000 was 747.  It is located at the confluence of the Sambú and Sabalo rivers. The town has an airstrip with a paved runway.

References

Corregimientos of Darién Province
Populated places in Darién Province
Road-inaccessible communities of Panama